Portage County is the name of two counties in the United States:

 Portage County, Ohio
 Portage County, Wisconsin